Hillsgrove may refer to:

Hillsgrove, Rhode Island - a village in western central Warwick, Rhode Island
Hillsgrove Township, Sullivan County, Pennsylvania - a township in Sullivan County, Pennsylvania